Huxelhydrus syntheticus is a species of beetle in the family Dytiscidae, the only species in the genus Huxelhydrus.

References

Dytiscidae